Verkhneivanayevo (Ürge İvanay) is a rural locality (a village) in Kuntugushevsky Selsoviet, Baltachevsky District, Bashkortostan, Russia. The population was 296 as of 2010. There are 5 streets.

Geography 
Verkhneivanayevo is located 10 km southeast of Starobaltachevo (the district's administrative centre) by road. Nizhneivanayevo is the nearest rural locality.

References 

Rural localities in Baltachevsky District